Lagorchestes is a genus of small, rabbit-like mammals commonly known as hare-wallabies. It includes four species native to Australia and New Guinea, two of which are extinct. Hare-wallabies belong to the macropod family (Macropodidae) which includes kangaroos, wallabies, and other marsupials.

Species
It has four species, two of which are extinct:

Extinct

The oldest known fossil of Lagorchestes is an 11,000-year-old one of the extant spectacled hare-wallaby.

References

External Links

Macropods
Marsupials of Australia
Marsupial genera
Taxa named by John Gould